"Funky Nassau" is a song written by Ray Munnings and Tyrone Fitzgerald and performed by the Beginning of the End. 

The song was recorded at Criteria Studios in Miami, engineered by Chuck Kirkpatrick, produced by Marlin Productions and arranged by the Beginning of the End.

It reached #7 on the US R&B chart, #15 on the Billboard Hot 100, and #31 on the UK Singles Chart in 1974.  The song was featured on their 1971 album, Funky Nassau.

The single ranked #75 on Billboard's Year-End Hot 100 singles of 1971.

Chart performance

Other versions
Herbie Mann recorded a version of the song subsequently released as a bonus track on the CD version of his 1971 studio album Push Push.
Orgone released a version of the song on their 2007 album The Killion Floor.

Song sampling
The song was sampled in the Prodigy's song "No Good (Start the Dance)" on their 1994 album Music for the Jilted Generation.  A mixed version was also included as part of "Section 8" on their 1999 album The Dirtchamber Sessions Volume One.

In popular culture
The Blues Brothers performed it in the 1998 film Blues Brothers 2000.
The Beginning of the End's version was featured in the 2005 film Elizabethtown.
 Swedish artist Säkert! refers to the song in her song which also shares the name "Funky Nassau".

References

1971 songs
1971 singles
The Blues Brothers songs